Bethania, Abercynon was an Independent chapel in Mountain Ash Road, Abercynon, Glamorgan, Wales. Services at Bethania were conducted in the Welsh language.

Early history
The church began in the form of a Sunday School and other informal meetings being held in houses in the community. The first chapel was built in 1893 but within a short time proved too small, As a result a new chapel was built in 1898 at a cost of £3,500 with seating for 700. The first minister was J. J. Williams, later Archdruid of Wales.

Ministry of W. Caradog Jones
Caradog Jones came to Abercynon from Oswestry in 1897. He left in 1903 after some disagreements at the chapel.

20th century
In 1910, Rev. J. T. Ll. Williams of Ebenezer, Cefncoed, Merthyr, accepted a call to minister at Bethania, as successor to D. Bryniog Thomas who had moved to Seion, Maesteg. At the induction services, Evan Jones, the senior deacon at Bethania, reflected that the decision to call upon the services of the new minister had been agreed to be the congregation without any dissension.

A number of members left in the early days to form Mount Zion English Baptist Chapel. The chapel closed in the 1970s and was demolished in 1990. The site was redeveloped in 1991 with flats named Bethania.

References

Bibliography

External links
Entry at Coflein

Chapels in Rhondda Cynon Taf
Demolished buildings and structures in Wales